Emsley is a surname. Notable people with the surname include:

Clive Emsley (born 1944), British historian and criminologist
Evangeline Lydia Emsley (1885–1967), Canadian nurse
John Emsley, British writer, broadcaster and academic specialising in chemistry
Lyndon Emsley (born 1964), British chemist
Paul Emsley (born 1947), South African painter now resident in Wiltshire, England
Richard Emsley (born 1951), British composer from Goole, Yorkshire

See also
Emsley A. Laney High School, high school just outside Wilmington, North Carolina